Kianyaga High School is a boys secondary school located in Gichugu Constituency, Kirinyaga County, Kenya.

References

High schools and secondary schools in Kenya
Kirinyaga County
Education in Central Province (Kenya)